Themmadi Velappan is a 1976 Indian Malayalam-language film, directed by Hariharan and produced by G. P. Balan. The film stars Prem Nazir, Madhu, Jayabharathi and KPAC Lalitha. It was released on 12 November 1976. The movie is a remake of 1974 Kannada movie Sampathige Savaal starring Dr. Rajkumar.

Plot

Cast 

Prem Nazir as Velappan
Madhu as Raghavan
Jayabharathi as Sindhu
KPAC Lalitha as Kalyani
Jose Prakash as Balakrishnan
Pattom Sadan as Claver
T. R. Omana as Bhavani
Bahadoor as Kuttappan
Kanakadurga as Madhavi
Nellikode Bhaskaran as Velu
P. K. Abraham as Gopalan
Paravoor Bharathan as Chaathu
Sudheer as Vijayan
Master Raghu as Young Velappan
Philomina as Aliyar's Mother

Soundtrack 
The music was composed by M. S. Viswanathan, with lyrics by Mankombu Gopalakrishnan.

References

External links 
 

1970s Malayalam-language films
1976 films
Films directed by Hariharan
Films scored by M. S. Viswanathan
Malayalam remakes of Kannada films